CSMT may stand for:

 MOS composite static induction thyristor 
 Chhatrapati Shivaji Terminus, officially Chhatrapati Shivaji Maharaj Terminus, in Bombay, India
 Chhatrapati Shahu Maharaj Terminus, in Kolhapur, India